Ingolf Georg August Gabold (born 31 March 1942 Heidelberg, Germany) is a Danish composer.  He is a graduate of the Royal Danish Academy of Music.

He has been the head of the dramatic fiction department at DR, the Danish national broadcaster.

References
Portrait article at Berlingske Tidende
Analysis of work at DVM
Analysis of work at DVM
Opera works

Danish composers
Male composers
1942 births
Living people